Rekat-e Sofla (also Romanized as Rekāt-e Soflá and Rekat Soflá; also known as Rekāt-e Pā’īn, Rikāt, Rīkat-e Pā’īn, and Rokāt Pā’īn) is a village in Baqeran Rural District, in the Central District of Birjand County, South Khorasan Province, Iran. At the 2006 census, its population was 83, in 28 families.

References 

Populated places in Birjand County